Thomas Martin Nolan (October 24, 1916 – April 7, 1989) was an American politician from Pennsylvania who served as a Democratic member of the Pennsylvania House of Representatives for the 34th district from 1969 to 1970 and the Pennsylvania State Senate for the 44th district from 1971 to 1978.

Early life
Nolan was born in Pittsburgh, Pennsylvania and graduated from Central Catholic High School.  He served as a corporal in the U.S. Army during World War II and was awarded the Purple Heart and 3 battle stars.

Career
He represented the 34th legislative district in the Pennsylvania House of Representatives from 1969 to 1970. He was then elected to represent the 44th senatorial district in the Pennsylvania Senate in 1970.

During a 1971 debate, Governor Milton Shapp's proposed a 5% state income tax. Nolan was one of two democratic holdouts in the Pennsylvania Senate. When the suggested rate was reduced to 3.5%, Nolan finally agreed to vote in favor of it. It was alleged that Nolan's brother Edward, was offered a bribe in exchange for convincing his brother to vote in favor of the tax. The matter was referred to the FBI, the Allegheny County District Attorney, and U.S. Attorney Richard Thornburgh, but no charges were ever filed.

Thom Nolan served in the Senate until 1978.

He and three other defendants, including Vince Fumo and Pete Carmiel, were accused of placing "ghost workers" on state payroll. The charges were later thrown out.

He died on April 7, 1989, in Braddock, Pennsylvania and is interred at Church Hill Cemetery in Wilkins Township, Pennsylvania.

References

1916 births
1989 deaths
20th-century American politicians
United States Army personnel of World War II
Democratic Party members of the Pennsylvania House of Representatives
Military personnel from Pennsylvania
Democratic Party Pennsylvania state senators
Politicians from Pittsburgh
United States Army soldiers
Central Catholic High School (Pittsburgh) alumni